Kiss of Araby is a 1933 American Pre-Code adventure film directed by Phil Rosen and starring Maria Alba, Walter Byron and Claire Windsor. It is an action melodrama set in the Middle East.

Plot
A British Army officer is forced to resign his commission, and joins forces in the desert with a local Arab leader against his own former comrades.

Cast
 Maria Alba as Dolores Mendez  
 Walter Byron as Lt. W. B. Lawrence  
 Claire Windsor as Mrs. Courtney  
 Theodore von Eltz as Capt. J.G. Randall  
 Claude King as Maj. J.W. Courtney  
 Frank Leigh as Sheik El Rahman  
 Edmund Cobb as Taleb  
 Carlotta Monti as Dancer  
 Alfred Cross as Lt. Snell  
 Reginald Simpson as Lt. Matthews

References

Bibliography
 Pitts, Michael R. Poverty Row Studios, 1929-1940. McFarland & Company, 2005.

External links
 

1933 films
1933 adventure films
American adventure films
Films directed by Phil Rosen
Films set in the Middle East
American black-and-white films
1930s English-language films
1930s American films